Pryor Field Regional Airport  is a public airport located three miles (5 km) northeast of the central business district of Decatur and south of Athens, in Limestone County, Alabama, United States. It is owned by Decatur/Athens Airport Authority.

Situated next to Calhoun Community College, the airport serves the western portion of the Huntsville-Decatur Combined Statistical Area and most of the Decatur Metropolitan Area. Pryor Field is currently the busiest regional airport in Alabama.

Facilities and aircraft 

For the 12-month period ending May 3, 2006, the airport had 167,701 aircraft operations, an average of 459 per day: 91% general aviation, 7% military and 2% air taxi. There are 144 aircraft based at this airport: 79% single engine, 14% multi-engine, 3% jet aircraft, 3% helicopters and 1% gliders.

The Pryor Field Regional Airport receives $30,000 annually each from the cities of Athens and Decatur and from the county commissions of Morgan and Limestone.

History
The airport opened in October 1941 with  square all-direction turf runway. It began training United States Army Air Corps flying cadets under contract to Southern Airways, Inc. and Southern Aviation Training School, Inc. It was assigned to Gulf Coast Training Center (later Central Flying Training Command) as a primary (level 1) pilot training airfield.

In addition, the school had had five local auxiliary airfields for emergency and overflow landings:
 Harris Station Auxiliary Field 
 Anderson Auxiliary Field       
 Beaver Dam Auxiliary Field     
 Poole Auxiliary Field          
 Tanner Auxiliary Field         (location undetermined)

Flying training was performed with Fairchild PT-19s as the primary trainer. It also had several PT-17 Stearmans and a few P-40 Warhawks assigned. The airport was inactivated on December 28, 1944, with the drawdown of AAFTC's pilot training program. It was declared surplus and turned over to the Army Corps of Engineers on September 30, 1945. It was eventually discharged to the War Assets Administration (WAA) and became a civil airport.

A newly built $1.8 million terminal building opened in 2008 at the north end of the field as part of a federally funded $3.3 million project.

In January 2010, the pilot training site was designated a historic landmark and added to the Alabama Register of Landmarks and Heritage.

Accidents and incidents
 In 2007, Chris Wright was struck by a propeller as he was "hand propping" starting his plane. He received a gash to the head, but recovered.
 In 2009, Steven Raddatz was killed when his Van's Aircraft RV-8 collided with a Russian-made Yakovlek owned and flown by B.J. Kennamore, the latter of which landed safely after the collision.

See also

 Alabama World War II Army Airfields
 29th Flying Training Wing (World War II)

References

 Manning, Thomas A. (2005), History of Air Education and Training Command, 1942–2002.  Office of History and Research, Headquarters, AETC, Randolph AFB, Texas 
 Shaw, Frederick J. (2004), Locating Air Force Base Sites, History’s Legacy, Air Force History and Museums Program, United States Air Force, Washington DC.

External links
 

1941 establishments in Alabama
USAAF Contract Flying School Airfields
Airfields of the United States Army Air Forces in Alabama
Airports in Alabama
Decatur, Alabama
Transportation buildings and structures in Limestone County, Alabama
Decatur metropolitan area, Alabama
Huntsville-Decatur, AL Combined Statistical Area
Landmarks in Alabama
Airports established in 1941